Robert Huber Hohn (born June 4, 1941 in Beatrice, Nebraska) is a former professional American football player who played defensive back for four seasons for the Pittsburgh Steelers. Hohn played college football at the University of Nebraska and was selected in the 20th round of the 1964 NFL Draft by the Los Angeles Rams.

References

1941 births
American football safeties
Nebraska Cornhuskers football players
Pittsburgh Steelers players
Living people
People from Beatrice, Nebraska